Fontainhas is a settlement in the northern part of the island of Santo Antão, Cape Verde. It is situated near the rocky north coast of the island, 2 km southwest of Ponta do Sol and 19 km north of the island capital Porto Novo. The settlement includes the smaller villages Corvo and Forminguinhas, about 1 km west of Fontainhas proper.

See also
List of villages and settlements in Cape Verde

References

External links

Villages and settlements in Santo Antão, Cape Verde
Ribeira Grande Municipality